Yubarisyuparo Dam (Re)  is a gravity dam located in Hokkaido Prefecture in Japan. The dam is used for flood control, irrigation, water supply and power production. The catchment area of the dam is 433 km2. The dam impounds about 1500  ha of land when full and can store 427000 thousand cubic meters of water. The construction of the dam was started on 1991 and completed in 2014.

References

Dams in Hokkaido